Ding Bangchao (born 11 October 1996) is a Chinese athlete specialising in the pole vault. He represented his country at the 2019 World Championships in Doha without qualifying for the final. In 2017 he won a gold medal at the Asian Championships in Bhubaneswar, India.

His personal bests in the event are 5.71 metres outdoors (Zhaoqing 2019) and 5.60 metres indoors (Xi'an 2019).

International competitions

References

1996 births
Living people
Chinese male pole vaulters
World Athletics Championships athletes for China